Oussama El Azzouzi (born 29 May 2001) is a Dutch footballer who plays for Union SG in the Belgian First Division A.

Club career
El Azzouzi had been in the youth set ups in the Netherlands for FC Groningen and Vitesse Arnhem and played for FC Emmen in the Eerste Divisie for one season, helping them gain promotion as champions to the Eredivisie at the end of the 2021–22 season. He signed a three year contract in Royale Union Saint-Gilloise in July 2022, with the option of an extra year. He made his debut for Union SG on 6 August 2002 starting a 3–0 away defeat against K.V. Mechelen.

Personal life
Born in the Netherlands, El Azzouzi is of Moroccan descent. He is the twin brother of the footballer Anouar El Azzouzi.

Honours
 Eerste Divisie
 Winner: 2021–22

References

Living people
2001 births
People from Veenendaal
Footballers from Utrecht (province)
Dutch footballers
Dutch sportspeople of Moroccan descent
FC Emmen players
Royale Union Saint-Gilloise players
Eerste Divisie players
Belgian Pro League players
Dutch expatriate footballers
Expatriate footballers in Belgium
Dutch expatriate sportspeople in Belgium
Twin sportspeople